Kismet is a 1956 Pakistani drama film directed by Nazir Ajmeri. It starred Musarrat Nazir and Santosh Kumar. It deals with theme of Talaaq, and was the debut film of Khalil Qaiser. The music was composed by Feroz Nizami.

A commercially successful film, it is considered as one of best film of Ajmeri's career. It was remade in 1976 by S. Suleman as Tallaq.

Plot 

The plot revolves around a happily married couple. The couple lead a happy life until they are threatened by misunderstandings among them, created by others. It leads to the rise of differences among them, which not only affect their relationship but their young daughter also.

Cast 

 Musarrat Nazir
 Santosh Kumar
 Yasmin
 Asha Posley
 Ilyas Kashmiri
 Rekha
 M. Ismael
 G. N. Butt
 Majeed

Music

References 

1950s Urdu-language films
Pakistani drama films
Urdu-language Pakistani films
Pakistani black-and-white films